Scarpa is an Italian surname

It may refer to:

Andrea Scarpa (born 1987), Italian boxer
Antonia Scarpa, American filmmaker and musician
Antonio Scarpa (1752–1832), Italian anatomist and professor
Carlo Scarpa (1906–1978), Italian architect 
Carola Scarpa (1971–2011), Brazilian actress and socialite
Natale Bentivoglio Scarpa, (1897–1946) an Italian magic realist painter
Daniele Scarpa (born 1964), Italian sprint canoer
David Scarpa, American screenwriter
Fernando Scarpa, director and actor
Francesco Scarpa (born 1979), Italian football player
Gino Scarpa (1924–2022), Italian-born Norwegian painter, printmaker and sculptor, and mountaineer
Gregory Scarpa Sr. (1928–1994), American capo and hitman for the Colombo crime family 
Gregory Scarpa Jr. (born 1951), American capo for the Colombo crime family and informant on international terrorists 
Gustavo Scarpa (born 1994), Brazilian footballer
Lawrence Scarpa (born 1959), American architect
Luke Joseph Scarpa (1928–2012), American professional wrestler better known as Chief Jay Strongbow
Marc Scarpa (born 1969), American entrepreneur, producer and director
Massimo Scarpa (born 1970), Italian golfer
Pedro Luís Guido Scarpa (1925–2018), Angolan Roman Catholic bishop of Ndalatando, Angola
Renato Scarpa (born 1939), Italian film actor
Rodrigo Scarpa, host of the Brazilian comedy television show broadcast Pânico na Band
Romano Scarpa (1927–2005), Italian comics artist
Roque Esteban Scarpa (1914–1995), Chilean writer, literary critic and scholar
Tiziano Scarpa (born 1963), Italian novelist, playwright and poet

See also
Fascia of Scarpa
Scarpa's ganglion
Foramina of Scarpa
Endolymph, also known as Scarpa's fluid
Grivel Scarpa Binding

Italian-language surnames